Kunqu, also known as Kunju, K'un-ch'ü, Kun opera or Kunqu Opera, is one of the oldest extant forms of Chinese opera. Kunqu is one of the oldest traditional operas of the Han nationality, and is also a treasure of Chinese traditional culture and art, especially opera art. It evolved from the local melody of Kunshan and later came to dominate Chinese theater from the 16th to the 18th centuries. The style originated in the Wu cultural area. It has been listed as one of the Masterpieces of the Oral and Intangible Heritage of Humanity by UNESCO since 2001. Since the mid-Ming Dynasty, Wei Liang Fu has been the sole leader of Chinese opera for nearly 300 years. In 2006, it was listed on the first national intangible cultural heritage list. In 2008, it was included in the List of Representative Works of Intangible Cultural Heritage of Humanity. In December 2018, the General Office of the Ministry of Education announced that Peking University is the base for inheriting excellent traditional Chinese culture in Kunqu.

Kunqu takes drum and board to control the rhythm of singing, with Qu flute, three strings and so on as the main accompanying instrument, its singing pronunciation is "Zhongzhou Rhyme."

History

 

Kunqu tunes are believed to have been developed during the Ming Dynasty by Wei Liang Fu (魏良輔) from the port of Taicang, but linked to the songs of nearby Kunshan. Wei created Kunshan tunes modified from songs of Haiyan (海鹽) near Hangzhou and Yiyang (弋陽) of Jiangxi, and he combined the nanxi rhythms which often used flute, and the northern zaju where plucked string instruments are preferred. The created elegant Kunshan tunes are often called "water mill" tunes (水磨調, shuimo diao). The first Kunqu opera, Washing Silken Gauze (浣紗記, Huan Sha Ji) was created by Liang Chenyu (梁辰魚) who was born in Kunshan and used Kunshan tunes throughout the opera. Kunqu is a form of chuanqi plays, and its emergence is said to have ushered in a "second Golden Era of Chinese drama." 

The most famous of Kunqu opera is The Peony Pavilion written by Tang Xianzu. Other important works include The Peach Blossom Fan, and The Palace of Eternal Life.

Kunqu performance influenced the performance of many other styles of Chinese musical theater, including Peking opera, which contains much Kunqu repertoire. Kunqu was referred to as Yabu (雅部, "elegant drama"), and it came under competition from a variety of operas (e.g. Shaanxi Opera, Clapper Opera, Yiyang tunes, Peking Opera, etc.) termed Huabu (花部, "flowery drama"), and as a result, Kunqu troupes experienced a commercial decline in the 19th century. However, in the early 20th century, Kunqu was re-established by philanthropists and was later subsidized by the Communist state. Like most traditional forms of Chinese opera, Kunqu suffered setbacks both during the Cultural Revolution and again under the influx of Western culture during the Reform and Opening Up policies, only to experience an even greater revival in the new millennium.

Today, Kunqu is professionally performed in seven major Mainland Chinese cities: Beijing (Northern Kunqu Theater), Shanghai (Shanghai Kunqu Theater), Suzhou (Suzhou Kunqu Theater), Nanjing (Jiangsu Province Kun Opera), Chenzhou (Hunan Kunqu Theater), Yongjia County/Wenzhou (Yongjia Kunqu Theater) and Hangzhou (Zhejiang Province Kunqu Theater), as well as in Taipei. Non-professional opera societies are active in many other cities in China and abroad, and opera companies occasionally tour.

In 1919 Mei Lanfang and Han Shichang, renowned performers of Kunqu, traveled to Japan to give performances. In the 1930s, Mei performed Kunqu in the United States and the Soviet Union and was well received.

Its melody or tune is one of the Four Great Characteristic Melodies in Chinese opera.

In 2006, Zhou Bing acted as a producer and art director for Kunqu (Kun Opera) of sexcentenary. It won Outstanding Documentary Award of 24th China TV Golden Eagle Awards; it won Award of TV Art Features of 21st Starlight Award for 2006.

Kunqu Opera is a rarity in the traditional culture and art of the Han nationality in China, especially in the art of opera. It is called an "orchid" in the hundred gardens.

Kunqu Opera is a blend of singing, singing, dancing and martial arts. It is known for its elegant lyrics, graceful style and delicate performance. It is one of the operas under the Southern Opera system, known as the "ancestor of hundred operas." Kunqu Opera uses drum and plate to control the rhythm of singing, and Qudi and three-stringed instruments as the main accompaniment instruments. Its pronunciation is "Zhongzhou rhyme."

Honors 
On May 18, 2001, UNESCO announced in Paris the first batch of "Oral and Intangible Heritage of Man" works, including the Kunqu art of China, which became one of the first 19 countries to receive the honor.

Kunqu Opera was listed as a masterpiece of the Oral and Intangible Heritage of Humanity by UNESCO in 2001 (and was included in the Masterpiece of the Intangible Cultural Heritage of Humanity in 2008). It was listed in the first batch of national intangible cultural heritage list in 2006.

In December 2018, the General Office of the Ministry of Education announced Peking University as the base of Kunqu Opera excellent traditional Chinese Culture Inheritance.

Kunqu opera took part in the 2019 Chinese Opera Culture Week on Oct 2, 2019.

 In September 2022, due to institutional reform, the protection unit was renamed Yongjia Kunqu Opera Troupe (Yongjia Kunqu Opera Training Institute).

In May 2022, Kunqu Opera was selected as one of the first "Masterpieces of the Oral Intangible Heritage of Humanity" by the United Nations.

Characteristics 
Kunqu Opera is characterized by the character line cavity, cavity with the character walk. Singing also has a certain cavity, different from other operas can be given free play according to the individual conditions of the actors. Instead, there are four strict determinations: tone, cavity, plate and spectrum. 

The main difference between Nankun and Beikun is not the geographical location of the troupe, but whether the music is southern or northern. Kunqu Qupai music can be divided into vocal qupai and instrumental Qupai according to its different uses.

The biggest feature of Kunqu opera performance is strong lyricism, delicate movements, and the combination of singing and dancing is ingenious and harmonious. Kunqu opera is a comprehensive art of song, dance, mediation, and white performance, and the performance characteristics of singing and dancing have been formed in the long-term performance history, especially reflected in the performance body of each character, and its dance body can be roughly divided into two types: one is the auxiliary posture when speaking and the dance of rewriting the intention developed by gestures; One is a lyrical dance with singing lyrics, which is not only a superb dance move, but also an effective means to express the character's character and the meaning of the lyrics.

The opera dance of Kunqu Opera has absorbed and inherited the traditions of ancient folk dance and court dance, and has accumulated rich experience in the close integration of rap and dance through long-term stage performance practice. To meet the needs of the performance venue of narrative writing, many dance performances that focus on description are created, and cooperate with "drama" to become a folding drama with a strong story. Adapted to the needs of the performance venue with strong lyricism and movement, many lyrical dance performances have been created, which have become the main performance means of many single-fold lyric song and dance.

The Nianbai of Kunqu Opera is also very characteristic, because Kunqu Opera was developed from Wuzhong, so its voice has the characteristics of Wu Nong soft language. Among them, Harlequin also has a local white based on the Wu dialect, such as Su Bai, Yangzhou Bai, etc. This market language in the Wuzhong area, has a strong sense of life, and often uses Allegro-style rhyme white, which is very distinctive. In addition, the singing of Kunqu opera has extremely strict specifications for the sound of words, lines, rhythm, etc., forming a complete singing theory.

Industry 
Kunqu opera is divided into three categories: sinian horn, fresh horn and pure clown.

Because the early Kun opera belongs to the Southern Opera system, it inherits the role industry system of the Southern Opera, and simultaneously absorbs the long of the Northern Zaju, taking the basic roles of Sheng, Dan, Jing, Mei, Chou, outer and paste seven acts.

Huan Sha Ji, an early work, reflects the character branch method in the early stage of Kun Opera. In addition to following the seven lines of Southern Opera, it also borrowed the setting method of Xiao Mei and Xiao Dan in Yuan Zaju, and added five lines of Xiao Sheng, Xiao Dan, Xiao Mei, Xiao Wai and Xiao Jing, a total of twelve lines.

During the boom of Kun opera in the late Ming Dynasty, in the Ming edition of the legend of Mohan Zhai, the original "tie" was changed to "Old Dan," which also absorbed the branch method of Zaju in the Yuan Dynasty. Other roles are basically the same as Kun opera in the early period. During the Kangxi period of the Qing Dynasty, The role industry of Kun opera basically maintained the system of "twelve characters in rivers and lakes."

During the reign of Qianlong, Kunqu Opera was the most popular, the performing arts were further improved, and new breakthroughs were made in the role industry system for characterizing characters.

With the development of performing arts, the division of roles in Kun opera has become more and more detailed. Between Jia and Dao, the role industry of Kun opera combines the original "twelve roles in rivers and lakes" with the later more detailed division of labor. Under the five lines of "Sheng, Dan, Jing, Mo and Chou," there are twenty smaller lines, called "twenty doors."

Traditional Kun opera professional class clubs usually only have 18 actors, commonly known as "18 nets," while only a few large class clubs have 27 actors. General class club as long as ten doors complete, can perform, other roles can be replaced by close to the door of the actor, the ten basic door is known as the "ten court column," they are: net, official health, cloth health, old age, end, Zhengdan, five Dan, six Dan, vice, ugly. Some of the most readily recognizable qualities of performance are: net, old, official students, Zhengdan four doors.

Each line of Kun opera has developed its own set of procedures and techniques in performance. These stylized action language has formed a complete and unique performance system of Kunqu Opera in terms of characterizing characters, expressing characters' psychological states, rendering drama and enhancing appeal.

Stage art 

In addition to inheriting the costume styles of opera characters since the Yuan and Ming dynasties, some costumes of Kunqu opera are very similar to the clothes that were popular in society at that time. Reflected in the play, military generals have their own uniforms, and civil officials also have a variety of clothes according to the class hierarchy of feudal society. Facebook is used for the two lines of net and ugly. Very few characters belonging to Sheng and Dan are also used by chance, such as Monkey King (生) and Zhong Wuyan (Dan), and the colors are basically red, white, and black.

After years of running-in processing, Kunqu opera art has formed a fairly perfect system, and this system has long occupied a dominant position in Chinese opera, so Kunqu opera art is revered as the "ancestor of a hundred operas," which has a profound impact on the development of the entire opera, and many local operas have absorbed its artistic nutrients to varying degrees, among which there are still some Kunqu operas.

Significance 
Kunqu Opera is the oldest existing drama form in China with a complete performance system, which has a profound influence on later Chinese operas.

Kunqu Opera has a long history and a wide and far-reaching influence. It is the crystallization of traditional culture and the model of opera performance. Kunqu Opera is a delicate art form with profound connotations. Kunqu Opera has a unique cultural value.

Chinese opera has been spreading on the stage since its formation. With the change of time, the script, the voice and the performance are constantly changing. Kunqu Opera, on the other hand, is known as a "living fossil" with less changes and more traditional features of traditional operas.

Kunqu Opera is very artistic, because it is the crystallization of ancient Chinese culture and art for hundreds of years. Kunqu Opera itself is of great artistic value. It is the only one of the three ancient operas in the world that has been preserved so far. It is also the representative of the traditional culture and art of the Han nationality. After hundreds of years of development, it has left countless precious cultural and artistic wealth for future generations.

By region 
Due to the extensive performance activities of Kunban, in the last years of Wanli, Kunqu opera was introduced to Beijing and Hunan through Yangzhou, ranking first among all voices and becoming the standard singing tone of legendary scripts: "Four Square Songs Must Zong Wumen." At the end of the Ming Dynasty and the beginning of the Qing Dynasty, Kunqu opera spread to Sichuan, Guizhou and Guangdong, and developed into a national drama. The singing of Kunqu opera was originally based on the Wu language pronunciation of Suzhou, but after it was introduced to various places, it was combined with local dialects and folk music to derive many genres, forming a rich and colorful Kunqu opera cavity system, and becoming a representative opera of the whole nation. During the Qianlong period of the Qing Dynasty, the development of Kunqu opera entered its heyday, and since then Kunqu opera has begun to dominate the pear garden, which has lasted for six or seven hundred years, becoming the oldest existing form of opera with a long tradition in China and even the world.

The Kunshan singing began to spread its area, initially limited to the Suzhou area, and during the Wanli period, it expanded to the south of the Yangtze River and north of the Qiantang River with Suzhou as the center, and also flowed into Beijing at the end of the Wanli period. In the Qing Dynasty, the Kangxi Emperor loved Kunqu opera, which made it even more popular. In this way, the Kunshan singing became the most influential vocal cavity drama from the middle of the Ming Dynasty to the middle of the Qing Dynasty.

Fujian 
 The earliest recorded introduction of Kunshan dialect into Fujian was in 1574. Kunqu Opera is widely distributed in Fujian, and has had some influence on local operas in Fujian more or less, directly or indirectly. For example, the representative opera "Ziyuchai," the main tune is "13 tunes." Kunqu Opera also appears in the folk form of sitting and singing.

Zhejiang 
Kunqu Opera, commonly known as "Cao Kun" and "Jin Kun," is a Kunqu opera spread in the Jinhua area of Zhejiang. It is called "Cao Kun" because of its simplification or change of local customs in language and melody.  Since the Ming Dynasty, it has been regarded as the authentic opera of Wu opera. In fact, Kunqu Opera is a tributary of Quzhou and Jinhua.

Performers 
Mei Lanfang
Zhang Jiqing
Hua Wenyi
Yan Huizhu
Zhang Jun

Notable works 
The Peony Pavilion (Tang Xianzu)
The Peach Blossom Fan (Kong Shangren)
The Palace of Long Life (Hong Sheng)
The White Snake
The Western Mansion (Southern version, adapted from Wang Shifu's zaju)
The Injustice done to Dou E (adapted from Guan Hanqing's zaju)
The Kite (Li Yu)

References

Further reading

External links

UNESCO the Oral and Intangible Heritage of Humanity Kunqu Opera
The Kunqu Society, Inc.
The Society of Kunqu Arts, Inc.
 What is Kunqu Theater?

 
Masterpieces of the Oral and Intangible Heritage of Humanity
Kunshan
Chinese art
Opera by country